Sarepta (near modern Sarafand, Lebanon) was a Phoenician city on the Mediterranean coast between Sidon and Tyre, also known biblically as Zarephath. It became a bishopric, which faded, and remains a double (Latin and Maronite) Catholic titular see.

Most of the objects by which Phoenician culture is characterised are those that have been recovered scattered among Phoenician colonies and trading posts; such carefully excavated colonial sites are in Spain, Sicily, Sardinia and Tunisia. The sites of many Phoenician cities, like Sidon and Tyre, by contrast, are still occupied, unavailable to archaeology except in highly restricted chance sites, usually much disturbed. Sarepta is the exception, the one Phoenician city in the heartland of the culture that has been unearthed and thoroughly studied.

History 

Sarepta is mentioned for the first time in the voyage of an Egyptian in the 14th century BCE. Obadiah says it was the northern boundary of Canaan: “And the exiles of this host of the sons of Israel who are among the Canaanites as far as Zarephath (Heb. צרפת), and the exiles of Jerusalem who are in Sepharad, will possess the cities of the south.” The medieval lexicographer, David ben Abraham Al-Alfāsī, identifies Zarephath with the city of Ṣarfend (Judeo-Arabic: צרפנדה). Originally Sidonian, the town passed to the Tyrians after the invasion of Shalmaneser IV, 722 BCE. It fell to Sennacherib in 701.

The first Books of Kings (17:8-24) describes the city as being subject to Sidon in the time of Ahab, and says that the prophet Elijah, after leaving the brook Cherith, multiplied the meal and oil of the widow of Zarephath (Sarepta) and raised her son from the dead there, an incident also referred to by Jesus in Luke's Gospel.

Zarephath (צרפת ṣārĕfáṯ, tsarfát; Σάρεπτα, Sárepta) in Hebrew became the eponym for any smelter or forge, or metalworking shop. In the 1st century CE, the Roman Sarepta, a port about a kilometer to the south is mentioned by Josephus and by Pliny the Elder.

Sarepta is the location of a Shia shrine to Abu Dhar al-Ghifari, a Companion of Muhammad. The shrine is believed to have been built at least several centuries after Abu Dhar's death.

After the Islamization of the area, in 1185, the Greek monk Phocas, making a gazetteer of the Holy Land (De locis sanctis, 7), found the town almost in its ancient condition. A century later, according to Burchard of Mount Sion, it was in ruins and contained only seven or eight houses. Even after the Crusaders' kingdoms had collapsed, the Roman Catholic Church continued to appoint purely titular bishops of Sarepta, the most noted being Thomas of Wroclaw who held the post from 1350 until 1378.

Ecclesiastical history 

Sarepta as a Christian city was mentioned in the Itinerarium Burdigalense; the Onomasticon of Eusebius and in Jerome; by Theodosius and Pseudo-Antoninus who, in the 6th century call it a small town but very Christian. It contained at that time a church dedicated to St. Elias (Elijah). The Notitia episcopatuum, a list of bishoprics made in Antioch in the 6th century, speaks of Sarepta as a suffragan see of Tyre; all of its bishops are unknown.

Titular sees 
The diocese was nominally restored as titular see, twice: in Latin and Maronite (Eastern Catholic) traditions.

Sarepta of the Maronites 
This titular bishopric was established in 1983.

It has had the following incumbents of the fitting episcopal (lowest) rank:
 Emile Eid (1982.12.20 – death 2009.11.30), in the Roman Curia : Vice-President of Pontifical Commission for the Revision of Code of Oriental Canon Law (1982.12.20 – 1990.10.18) and on emeritate; previously Defender of the Bond of Supreme Tribunal of the Apostolic Signatura (1969? – 1974), Promoter of Justice of the same Supreme Tribunal of the Apostolic Signatura (1969 – 1980)
 Hanna G. Alwan, Congregation of the Lebanese Maronite Missionaries (L.M.) (2011.08.13 – ...), Bishop of Curia of the Maronites at the Patriarchate of Antioc; previously Prelate Auditor of Tribunal of the Roman Rota (1996.03.04 – 2011.08.13).

Sarepta of the Romans 
It was established as titular bishopric no later than the 15th century.
It has been vacant for decades, having had the following incumbents:
 Theodorich, (around 1350), as Auxiliary Bishop of Roman Catholic Diocese of Olomouc (Moravia)
 Jaroslav of Bezmíře, appointed Bishop of Sarepta on 1394.7.15 by Pope Boniface IX
 Guillaume Vasseur, Dominican Order (O.P.) (1448.10.23 – death 1476?), no actual prelature
 Gilles Barbier, Friars Minor (O.F.M.) (1476.04.03 – death 1494.03.28) as Auxiliary Bishop of Diocese of Tournai (Belgium) (1476.04.03 – 1494.03.28)
 Nicolas Bureau, O.F.M. (1519.12.02 – death 1551) as Auxiliary Bishop of Diocese of Tournai (Belgium) (1519.12.02 – 1551)
 Guillaume Hanwere (1552.04.27 – 1560) as Auxiliary Bishop of above Tournai (Belgium) (1552.04.27 – 1560)
 Johannes Kaspar Stredele 'Austrian) (1631.12.15 – death 1642.12.28) as Auxiliary Bishop of Diocese of Passau (Bavaria, Germany) (1631.12.15 – 1642.12.28)
 Wojciech Ignacy Bardziński (1709.01.28 – death 1722?) as Auxiliary Bishop of Diocese of Kujawy–Pomorze (Poland) (1709.01.28 – 1722?)
 Charles-Antoine de la Roche-Aymon (1725.06.11 – 1730.10.02) as Auxiliary Bishop of Diocese of Limoges (France) (1725.06.11 – 1730.10.02); later Bishop of Tarbes (France) ([1729.12.27] 1730.10.02 – 1740.11.11), Metropolitan Archbishop of Toulouse (France) ([1740.01.10] 1740.11.11 – 1752.12.18), Metropolitan Archbishop of Narbonne (France) ([1752.10.02] 1752.12.18 – 1763.01.24), Metropolitan Archbishop of Reims (France) ([1762.12.05] 1763.01.24 – death 1777.10.27), created Cardinal-Priest with no Title assigned (1771.12.16 – 1777.10.27)
 Johann Anton Wallreuther (1731.03.05 – 1734.01.16) as Auxiliary Bishop of Diocese of Worms (Germany) (1731.03.05 – 1734.01.16)
 Jean de Cairol de Madaillan (1760.01.28 – 1770.01.29) as Auxiliary Bishop of Archdiocese of Narbonne (France) (1760.01.28 – ?); later Bishop of Vence (France) (1770.01.29 – 1771.12.16), Bishop of Grenoble (France) (1771.12.16 [1772.01.23] – 1779.12.10)
 Jean-Denis de Vienne (1775.12.18 – death 1800) as Auxiliary Bishop of Lyon (France) (1775.12.18 – 1800)
 Alois Jozef Krakowski von Kolowrat (1800.12.22 – 1815.03.15) as Auxiliary Bishop of Archdiocese of Olomouc (Olomütz, Moravia, now Czech Republic) (1800.12.22 – 1815.03.15), Bishop of Hradec Králové (now Czech Republic) (1815.03.15 – 1831.02.28), Metropolitan Archbishop of Archdiocese of Praha (Prague, Bohemia, now Czech Republic) (1831.02.28 – death 1833.03.28)
 Johann Heinrich Milz (1825.12.19 – death 1833.04.29) as Auxiliary Bishop of Trier (Germany) (1825.12.19 – 1833.04.29)
 Johann Stanislaus Kutowski (1836.02.01 – death 1848.12.29) as Auxiliary Bishop of Diocese of Chełmno (Kulm, Poland) (1836.02.01 – 1848.12.29)
 Franz Xaver Zenner (1851.02.17 – death 1861.10.29) as Auxiliary Bishop of Archdiocese of Wien (Vienna, Austria) (1851.02.17 – 1861.10.29)
 Nicholas Power (1865.04.30 – death 1871.04.05) as Coadjutor Bishop of Killaloe (Ireland) (1865.04.30 – 1871.04.05)
 Jean-François Jamot (1874.02.03 – 1882.07.11) as only Apostolic Vicar of Northern Canada (Canada) (1874.02.03 – 1882.07.11); next (see) promoted first Bishop of Peterborough (Canada) (1882.07.11 – death 1886.05.04)
 Antonio Scotti (1882.09.25 – 1886.01.15) as Auxiliary Bishop of Archdiocese of Benevento (Italy) (1882.09.25 – 1886.01.15); next Bishop of Alife (Italy) (1886.01.15 – retired 1898.03.24), emeritate as Titular Bishop of Tiberiopolis (1898.03.24 – death 1919.06.10)
 Paulus Palásthy (1886.05.04 – death 1899.09.24) as Auxiliary Bishop of Archdiocese of Esztergom (Hungary) (1886.05.04 – 1899.09.24)
 Filippo Genovese (Italian) (1900.12.17 – death 1902.12.16), no actual prelature 
 Joseph Müller (1903.04.30 – death 1921.03.21) as Auxiliary Bishop of Archdiocese of Köln (Cologne, Germany) (1903.04.30 – 1921.03.21)
 Edward Doorly (1923.04.05 – 1926.07.17) as Coadjutor Bishop of Elphin (Ireland) (1923.04.05 – succession 1926.07.17); next Bishop of Elphin (1926.07.17 – 1950.04.05)
 Petar Dujam Munzani (1926.08.13 – 1933.03.16) as Apostolic Administrator of Archdiocese of Zadar (Croatia) (1926.08.13 – succession 1933.03.16); later Archbishop of Zadar (Croatia) (1933.03.16 – retired 1948.12.11), emeritate as Titular Archbishop of Tyana (1948.12.11 – death 1951.01.28)
 François-Louis Auvity (1933.06.02 – 1937.08.14) as Auxiliary Bishop of Archdiocese of Bourges (France) (1933.06.02 – 1937.08.14); later Bishop of Mende (France) (1937.08.14 – retired 1945.09.11), emeritate as Titular Bishop of Dionysiana (1945.09.11 – death 1964.02.15)
 Francesco Canessa (1937.09.04 – 1948.01.14)
 John Francis Dearden (later Cardinal) (1948.03.13 – 1950.12.22)
 Athanasios Cheriyan Polachirakal (1953.12.31 – 1955.01.27)
 Luis Andrade Valderrama, Friars Minor (O.F.M.) (1955.03.09 – 1977.06.29)

Archaeology 
A Heavy Neolithic archaeological site of the Qaraoun culture that pre-dated Sarepta by several thousand years was discovered at Sarafand by Hajji Khalaf. He made a collection of material and passed it to the National Museum of Beirut. It consisted of an assemblage of large flakes and bifaces in Eocene flint. Khalaf also found a well-made adze and a narrow, slightly polished chisel. A collection in the National Museum of Beirut marked "Jezzine ou Sarepta" consisted of around twelve neatly made discoid- and tortoise-cores in cherty flint of a cream colour with a tinge of red.

The low tell on the seashore was excavated by James B. Pritchard over five years from 1969 to 1974. 

Civil war in Lebanon put an end to the excavations.

The site of the ancient town is marked by the ruins on the shore to the south of the modern village, about eight miles to the south of Sidon, which extend along the shore for a mile or more. They are in two distinct groups, one on a headland to the west of a fountain called ‛Ain el-Ḳantara, which is not far from the shore. Here was the ancient harbor which still affords shelter for small craft. The other group of ruins, to the south, consists of columns, sarcophagi and marble slabs, indicating a city of considerable importance.

Pritchard's excavations revealed many artifacts of daily life in the ancient Phoenician city of Sarepta: pottery workshops and kilns, artifacts of daily use and religious figurines, numerous inscriptions that included some in Ugaritic. Pillar worship is traceable from an 8th-century shrine of Tanit-Ashtart, and a seal with the city's name made the identification secure. The local Bronze Age-Iron Age stratigraphy was established in detail; absolute dating depends in part on correlations with Cypriote and Aegean stratigraphy.

The climax of the Sarepta discoveries at Sarafand is the cult shrine of "Tanit/Astart", who is identified in the site by an inscribed votive ivory plaque, the first identification of Tanit in her homeland. The site revealed figurines, further carved ivories, amulets and a cultic mask.

Other uses of the name

In Hebrew after the Diaspora, the name צרפת, ts-r-f-t, Tsarfat (Zarephath) is used to mean France, perhaps because the Hebrew letters ts-r-f, if reversed, become f-r-ts. That usage is retained in daily use in contemporary Israel.

See also
 Cities of the ancient Near East
 List of Catholic dioceses in Lebanon

References

Sources
 Pritchard, James B. Recovering Sarepta, a Phoenician City: Excavations at Sarafund, 1969-1974, University Museum of the University of Pennsylvania  (Princeton: Princeton University Press) 1978, 
William P. Anderson, Sarepta I: The late bronze and Iron Age strata of area II.Y : the University Museum of the University of Pennsylvania excavations at Sarafand, Lebanon (Publications de l'Universite libanaise), Département des publications de l'Universite Libanaise, 1988
Issam A. Khalifeh, Sarepta II: The Late Bronze and Iron Age Periods of Area Ii.X, University Museum of the University of Pennsylvania, 1988, 
Robert Koehl, Sarepta III: the Imported Bronze & Iron Age, University Museum of the University of Pennsylvania, 1985, 
James B. Pritchard, Sarepta IV: The Objects from Area Ii.X, University Museum of the University of Pennsylvania, 1988, 
Lloyd W. Daly, A Greek-Syllabic Cypriot Inscription from Sarafand, Zeitschrift für Papyrologie und Epigraphik, Bd. 40, pp. 223–225, 1980
Dimitri Baramki, A Late Bronze Age tomb at Sarafend, ancient Sarepta, Berytus, vol. 12, pp. 129–42, 1959
Charles Cutler Torrey, The Exiled God of Sarepta, Berytus, vol. 9, pp. 45–49, 1949

External links 
 GCatholic - Latin titular see
 GCatholic - Maronite titular see
 Catholic Encyclopedia: Sarepta

Sidon District
Archaeological sites in Lebanon
Phoenician cities
Phoenician sites in Lebanon
Hebrew Bible cities
Coloniae (Roman)
Populated places in Lebanon
Mediterranean port cities and towns in Lebanon
Populated coastal places in Lebanon
Former populated places in Southwest Asia
Tells (archaeology)